Efua Sutherland Children's Park (also known as Children's Park) is a  public park for children located opposite The National Theatre at West Ridge in the Greater Accra Region of Ghana. It was started in 1979 and known as Accra Children's Park or Ridge Park and later renamed after Ghanaian playwright and children's author, Efua Sutherland. As of 2019, the park has seen less development since its inception.

References

External links
 "ESI SUTHERLAND ADDY PERSONALITY - PROFILE FRIDAY ON JOYNEWS (14-3-14)", My JoyOnline. YouTube

Accra